Domenico Pacini (Marino, February 20, 1878 – Rome, May 23, 1934) was an Italian physicist noted for his contributions to the discovery of cosmic rays.

Biography
He graduated in Physics at the University of Rome in 1902. Assistant at the "Regio Ufficio Centrale di Meteorologia e di Geodinamica" (Italian Agency of Meteorology and Geodynamics) from 1905 to 1927. Teacher of Geophysics from 1915 to 1925 at the University of Rome, then professor of Experimental physics at the University of Bari from 1928.

It had been observed that an electroscope in a vessel at earth potential gradually lost its charge, even if very carefully insulated, due to the ionization of the air. Pacini observed simultaneous variations of the rate of ionization on mountains, over a lake, over the sea, and underwater. In an experiment performed in June 1911, Pacini concluded that ionization underwater was significantly lower than on the sea surface. He could then demonstrate that a certain part of the ionization itself must be due to sources other than the radioactivity of the Earth, thus contributing to the discovery of cosmic rays.

References

External links
 University of Pavia, Biography of Domenico Pacini
 A. De Angelis et al., "Domenico Pacini, un pioniere dimenticato dello studio dei raggi cosmici", Nuovo Saggiatore 24 (2008) 70. 

1878 births
1934 deaths
People from Marino, Lazio
Experimental physicists
Italian meteorologists
20th-century Italian physicists
Academic staff of the Sapienza University of Rome
Academic staff of the University of Bari